The Virginia Judge is a 1935 American drama film directed by Edward Sedgwick, written by Frank R. Adams and Inés López, and starring Walter C. Kelly, Marsha Hunt, Stepin Fetchit, Johnny Downs, Robert Cummings and Virginia Hammond. It was released on September 17, 1935, by Paramount Pictures.

Plot

Cast 
Walter C. Kelly as Judge
Marsha Hunt as Mary Lee Calvert
Stepin Fetchit as Spasm Johnson
Johnny Downs as Bob Stuart
Robert Cummings as Jim Preston
Virginia Hammond as Martha Davis

References

External links 
 

1935 films
1930s English-language films
American drama films
1935 drama films
Paramount Pictures films
Films directed by Edward Sedgwick
American black-and-white films
1930s American films